Ambrose J. Murphy (1869–1949) was an American architect whose practice was based in Providence Rhode Island. He was a specialist in ecclesiastical work and, in a career that spanned over 40 years, designed many buildings for the Roman Catholic Diocese of Providence Rhode Island and Fall River Massachusetts.

Early life and career
Murphy was born July 12, 1869, in Worcester, Massachusetts, where he likely was educated. He began his architectural career with his uncle James Murphy (1834–1907), an ecclesiastical architect in Providence, Rhode Island. After this he worked briefly as a draughtsman for Martin & Hall.

Architectural practice
In 1900 he entered into a partnership with Franklin R. Hindle to form the firm Murphy & Hindle. Benjamin W. Wright joined the firm, now known as Murphy, Hindle & Wright, in 1907. The firm was dissolved in 1917 after which Murphy continued to work under his own name.

In 1918 Murphy began working with Samuel M. Morino, who continued with him and eventually inherited the office after Murphy retired in 1942. Murphy died on May 27, 1949.

Personal life

Legacy
Ambrose Murphy began his long and distinguished career at roughly the same time that Charles Maginnis of Boston, Massachusetts, was beginning his. The younger Murphy was probably be greatly influenced by Maginnis's beliefs. His unique ecclesiastical buildings are said to be much admired locally and have found their way to some of the National Registers.

Works

with James Murphy
 1896–1900 Holy Name of Jesus Church, Providence, Rhode Island

Murphy and Hindle
 1900 St. Anthony Church, Providence, Rhode Island
 1900 St. Andrew Summer Church, Block Island, Rhode Island
 1903 St. Agnes Church, Providence, Rhode Island
 1905 Our Lady of Lourdes Church, Providence, Rhode Island
 1905 Immaculate Conception Church, North Easton, Massachusetts
 1905 St. Thomas Moore Church, Narragansett, Rhode Island
 1906 Our Lady of the Rosary Church, Providence, Rhode Island
 1907 St. Ann Church, Cranston, Rhode Island (St Ann's Parish closed in 2013; church is now St George Maronite Catholic Church. http://www.stgeorgemaronitecatholicchurch.com/ ) 
 1908 Immaculate Conception Church, Providence, Rhode Island (The church and the entire surrounding neighborhood were demolished for "Urban Renewal" circa late 1950s.)
 St. Patrick Church, Providence Rhode Island (demolished, 1980, due to structural problems)

Murphy, Hindle and Wright

 1908 Holy Ghost Church, Providence, Rhode Island
 1909 St. Ann Church, Providence, Rhode Island
 1912 Assumption Church, Providence, Rhode Island
 1914 St. Rita Church, Warwick, Rhode Island
 1901-1915 St. Michael Church (The current building replaced the second church built in 1868, and designed by his uncle James Murphy. In 1906, services were moved from the old church into the much larger basement chapel of the new church while the Upper Church was being completed. The Upper Church was dedicated on October 3, 1915.) The parish complex is on the National Register of Historic Places.

Ambrose J. Murphy
 1916 St. Sebastian Church, Providence, Rhode Island
 1919 Our Lady of Mt. Carmel Church, Bristol, Rhode Island
 1924 Our Lady of Consolation Church, Pawtucket, Rhode Island
 1924 Santo Christo Church, Fall River, Massachusetts
 1925 Our Lady of Lourdes Church, Providence, Rhode Island
 1927 St. Anthony Church, Woonsocket, Rhode Island
 1928 Jesus Savior Church, Newport, Rhode Island
 1930 St. Paul Church, Edgewood, Cranston, Rhode Island (with Samuel Morino, supervising architect)
 1931 St. Matthew Church, Cranston, Rhode Island
 1933 St. Alexander Church, Warren, Rhode Island (basement only, superstructure built by Joseph M. Mosher)
 1935 St. Mary Church, Cranston, Rhode Island
 1937 St. Patrick Church, Harrisville, Burrillville, Rhode Island
 1939 Our Lady of Grace Church, Johnston, Rhode Island (Basement church, new upper church built late 1960s)
 1942 St. Mary Star of the Sea Church, Narragansett, Rhode Island

References

1869 births
1949 deaths
American ecclesiastical architects
Architects of Roman Catholic churches
Architects from Worcester, Massachusetts
Architects from Providence, Rhode Island